Ozark is a city in and the county seat of Christian County, Missouri. Its population was 21,284 as of the 2020 census. The 2019 population estimate was 20,482. Ozark is also the third largest city in the Springfield, Missouri Metropolitan Area, and is centered along a business loop of U.S. Route 65, where it intersects with Missouri Route 14.

History
Ozark was named after the Ozark Mountains, in which it is situated. The Ozark Courthouse Square Historic District was listed on the National Register of Historic Places in 2009.

The name Ozarks is believed to have begun sometime in the late 1700s or early 1800s from those living in the Arkansas area who were heading north and said they were going to the Ozarks.

The first settler to visit the area is believed to be Henry Schoolcraft, who arrived in 1818. During that time he studied extensively the geological makeup of the area and noted the high concentration of lead and zinc. Notably, in the Elk Valley area. Schoolcraft noted on the abundance of elk, bear and other wildlife in the area. This later became the area's hunting grounds, until the elk were hunted to extinction in the 1880s.

Most of the lead and zinc mines functioned until the early 1900's. There is an interactive map and history of mines and locations found here. The majority of the mining done in Ozark, Missouri was done in the Elk Valley area.

Geography
Ozark is located at  (37.027111, −93.209572).

Climate

Demographics

In 2012, press reports described Ozark as the fastest-growing city in Missouri.

2010 census
At the 2010 census there were 17,820 people, 6,603 households, and 4,689 families living in the city. The racial makeup of the city was 95.2% White, 0.8% African American, 0.5% Native American, 0.5% Asian, 0.1% Pacific Islander, 0.8% from other races, and 2.0% from two or more races. Hispanic or Latino of any race were 3.2%.

Of the 6,603 households 43.4% had children under the age of 18 living with them, 52.6% were married couples living together, 14.0% had a female householder with no husband present, 4.4% had a male householder with no wife present, and 29.0% were non-families. 23.1% of households were one person and 7.8% were one person aged 65 or older. The average household size was 2.65 and the average family size was 3.14.

The median age was 30.9 years. 30.2% of residents were under the age of 18; 9.1% were between the ages of 18 and 24; 31.6% were from 25 to 44; 19.1% were from 45 to 64; and 10.1% were 65 or older. The gender makeup of the city was 47.3% male and 52.7% female.

2000 census
At the 2000 census there were 9,665 people, 3,635 households, and 2,599 families living in the city. The population density was 1,280.8 people per square mile (494.3/km). There were 3,853 housing units at an average density of 510.6 per square mile (197.0/km). The racial makeup of the city was 96.36% White, 0.71% Native American, 0.33% African American, 0.30% Asian, 0.07% Pacific Islander, 0.59% from other races, and 1.63% from two or more races. Hispanic or Latino of any race were 1.70%.

Of the 3,635 households 40.9% had children under the age of 18 living with them, 55.2% were married couples living together, 12.9% had a female householder with no husband present, and 28.5% were non-families. 23.2% of households were one person and 7.7% were one person aged 65 or older. The average household size was 2.57 and the average family size was 3.04.

The age distribution was 28.9% under the age of 18, 10.7% from 18 to 24, 34.5% from 25 to 44, 16.1% from 45 to 64, and 9.8% 65 or older. The median age was 30 years. For every 100 females, there were 88.5 males. For every 100 females age 18 and over, there were 83.9 males.

The median household income was $34,210 and the median family income was $40,069. Males had a median income of $30,599 versus $21,794 for females. The per capita income for the city was $15,912. About 10.4% of families and 11.7% of the population were below the poverty line, including 17.3% of those under age 18 and 9.9% of those age 65 or over.

Economy
Ozark was home to Simclar Interconnect Technologies, a  Simclar Group factory, providing backplane fabrication for telecommunications and data communications customers. In 2007, Simclar moved 115 jobs to Ozark from Springfield, lured by a "tax incentive under which the company donated $1 million to a local not-for-profit corporation, which in turn will buy buildings, machinery and equipment and lease them back to Simclar." In 2012, Los Angeles-based private equity firm Balmoral Funds LLC acquired the Ozark plant as part of an agreement that included plants in Hialeah, Florida and Matamoros, Mexico. The company was renamed Concurrent Manufacturing Solutions LLC.

The Springfield/Ozark Mountain Ducks were an independent baseball team playing in the Central Baseball League from 1998 to 2003; Price Cutter Park, which was built in early 1999, was their home field.

In 2011, B&B Theatres built a cinema between Ozark and Nixa along Route 14.
The Belltower Chapel, originally the Ozark Christian Church, was built in 1912 and is located off of the Historic Courthouse Square in Ozark; since its 21st-century renovation it serves as a venue for weddings and other events.

Whataburger opened a location in Ozark in 2023.

Education
Public education in Ozark is administered by the Ozark R-VI School District. This includes, Ozark High School, Ozark Middle School, and 4 elementary schools.

Ozark has a public library, the Christian County Library.

Notable people
Lucas Harrell, MLB player for the Toronto Blue Jays

Jade Hayes, Beach Handball player for Team USAhttps://www.teamusa.org/usa-team-handball/athletes/Jade-Hayes

References

External links
 
 Official Ozark School District website
 Historic maps of Ozark in the Sanborn Maps of Missouri Collection at the University of Missouri

Populated places established in 1890
Cities in Christian County, Missouri
County seats in Missouri
Cities in Missouri
Springfield metropolitan area, Missouri
1890 establishments in Missouri